Koipuram is a large census village in Tiruvalla, Pathanamthitta district in the state of Kerala, India. Kumbanad, Muttumon, Pullad, Poovathoor, are the nodal points.

Demographics
Koipuram is a large census village located in Tiruvalla, with 7319 families residing. The population of Koipuram area is 26425, of which 12231 are males while 14194 are females as per the Population Census of 2011. Average Sex Ratio of Koipuram village is 1160 which is higher than the Kerala state average of 1084. Child Sex Ratio for the Koipuram as per census is 989, higher than the Kerala average of 964. Koipuram village has higher literacy rate compared to Kerala. In 2011, the literacy rate of Koipuram village was 97.31% compared to 94.00% of Kerala. In Koipuram male literacy was at 97.57% while female literacy rate was 97.09%.

The native language spoken is Malayalam, though most of the people can understand as well as converse in English.

History
Koipuram was once a very dense forest area, which were a part of the forests that lead along all the way until Kumbanad. The first occupants of this place was considered to be by the Kovilans, who eloped from Malabar, northern part of Kerala. As the Tippu Sultan, approached northern Kerala for his campaign, some of the generals of the zamorins were instructed to elope to central Kerala to save the lives of the women and children. They at first occupied on the southern bank of the River Pamba, as e preliminary stage of occupancy. They built a temple on that river bank, which they had brought from Malabar when they eloped. This temple is considered to be the present day Idanattidam Devi Temple. Later on, they finalized their occupancy and moved on to the northern bank of the river. They deforested the area and started plantation. Later on, due to the influence of the river, trade flourished on the banks of the river. A daily evening market was held on at the south eastern part of Koipuram, which is supposed to be, the present day Arattupuzha. As trade flourished, the Kovilans became more influential in the area and they were the predominant power in places nearing, present day Aranmula. However, enemies kept on attacking the province due to the crave on wealth and geography. The Kovilans were mightier and invincible than any other force which occupied central Kerala and thus they were not at all laid down by any other province or their army. The place name was then changed to Kovil-puram since the Kovilans occupied it and later as Koipuram.  The Kovilans who came thus put their house name as kovilan-veedu and later as konjum veedu. Trade and economy had put on a surge, the Kovilans became much likely to be invincible. With, present day Nellickal as their headquarters, they set for a rule where no one could ever threaten a province. Afterwards, during the Royal British Rule period, they were forced to remain under the jurisdiction of Her Majesty The Queen since they had promised allegiance to the Trivandrum Palace, where now is the present day capital of Kerala.

Palliyodam
The Koipuram palliyodam, which was being shared between two Karayogams (karayogam means panchayats in native language), Koipuram and Nellickal for almost 20 years back. Later on, as a part of the conflict between the two places, Nellickal Karayogam conceded to withdraw their share from the Palliyodam cost and Koipuram karayogam owned the palliyodam for themselves from then until now. The past of the palliyodam is well versed throughout the Aranmula premises. It is said that once the Palliyodam has crossed a barrier in front of it, in form of a ridge in the river, without any external help by surging over it. Some say it is supposed to be pure myth while the historians are not yet sure about the incident since there are not much practical evidences rather than some hearsay.

The Palliyodam has scored lot more than any other palliyodams, though being in second position to Nedumprayar. The rivalry between these two places extend long back to decades as both of these were the supreme powers in Aranmula boat race for over a period of time. Evidences show that both of these palliyodams are built in a common style named 'ottamanikkaal' which is considered to be a rare form of creation.

Landscape
Being on the northern bank of the River Pamba, Koipuram provides a marvellous view of landscapes and scenarios. The present day "Varattaar" which is a seasonal river, is the old course of the River Pamba and has been narrowed due to the introduction of a bridge. The place offers fantastic soothing landscapes and traditions, where it is possible to see a typical Indian village life.

Religion
ST JOSEPH CSI CHURCH,POOVATHOR , KOIPURAM.
Assemblies of God in India, Kumbanad.
India Pentecostal Church of God, Kumbanad. 
The Pentecostal Mission, Kumbanad.
 New Life Assembly of God Worship Center, Kadapra, Kumbanad.

References

Villages in Pathanamthitta district
Villages in Thiruvalla taluk